Fabio Fehr (born 15 January 2000) is a Swiss professional footballer who plays as a winger for Vaduz.

Professional career
On 16 February 2021, Fehr signed his first professional contract with Grasshoppers. He made his professional debut with Grasshoppers in a 0–0 Swiss Super League tie with BSC Young Boys on 31 February 2021.

On 31 August 2021, he joined Schaffhausen on loan for the 2021–22 season. On 7 January 2022, Fehr moved on a new loan to Vaduz. On 4 May 2022, Vaduz exercised their buy option to acquire Fehr until at least 2024.

References

External links
 
 SFL Profile
 

2000 births
Living people
Sportspeople from the canton of St. Gallen
Swiss men's footballers
Switzerland youth international footballers
Association football wingers
FC Schaffhausen players
FC Vaduz players
Swiss Super League players
Swiss Challenge League players
Swiss expatriate footballers
Expatriate footballers in Liechtenstein
Swiss expatriate sportspeople in Liechtenstein